Frederick Maxwell (10 January 1849 – 15 January 1881) was a Scottish former international rugby union player who played for the Royal Engineers rugby union side. He was a Forward.

Rugby union career

Amateur career

Maxwell played rugby for the Royal Engineers.

International career

He was capped once for Scotland. His sole international appearance came in the second international match in 1872 playing against England at The Oval, London.

Cricket career

Maxwell also played cricket for the Royal Engineers in the period 1869 - 1875

References

1849 births
1881 deaths
Rugby union players from Plymouth, Devon
Scottish rugby union players
Scotland international rugby union players
Rugby union forwards